Tako may refer to:

 Tako, Chiba, a town in Japan
 Tako (band), a Yugoslav progressive rock band
 Tako, Japanese for octopus
 Ibrahim Tako, Nigerian frontier politician
 Tako hiki, a Japanese knife used to prepare sashimi
 Takoyaki, a type of dumpling
 "Tako", women's name commonly used in Georgia

See also
Taco (disambiguation)